Sándor Lenkei (9 November 1936 – 20 June 2003) was a Hungarian footballer. He played in four matches for the Hungary national football team in 1957.

References

1936 births
2003 deaths
Hungarian footballers
Hungary international footballers
Association football forwards
Footballers from Budapest